Christine Cannon (born as Christine Allison) is a Scottish curler.

She also won bronze at the 2017 World Senior Championships.

Her husband is fellow Scottish curler Jim Cannon, 1989 European champion.

Teams

References

External links
 
 

Living people
Scottish female curlers
Scottish curling champions
Year of birth missing (living people)